Milford High School (MHS) is the secondary school for the district of Milford, Massachusetts, Milford Public Schools. Its principal is Joshua Otlin and Sissela Tucker (House A) is associate principal. Christine Ravesi Weinstein (House A) and Richard Piergustavo (House B) are assistant principals.

School organization

The current building was opened in 1973. The school has a football field with home and away team seating, football practice field, softball field, soccer fields, twenty-five yard swimming pool with springboard diving board, full theater, and a roughly 750-spot parking lot.

It is an SAT, PSAT, and ACT testing center, providing students, both resident and out-of-town, a place to take the required tests.

Recently, measures have been taken to provide students with the highest level of security available: school-wide security cameras and lobby sign-in kiosks have been added, as well as a juvenile Milford police officer present.

Houses

The schools is divided into two "houses", A and B. Currently, a student's grade determines their house. The House A office is located on the main level off of the A-wing and next to the Milford Community School Use Office. The House A office is where the Freshman and Juniors would go for help. The House B office is on the second floor right off of the A-wing and located directly above the House A office. The House B office is where the Sophomores and Seniors would go for help.

Wings

The Milford High School building has six wings, named A-F.

A-Wing

The A-Wing is the main instructional area of the school. It houses the majority of math classes, English classes, and history classes. Government classes are also taught here.

B-Wing

The B-Wing is the school's main information center. It includes the school's library media center, headed by Nicholas Molinari; video production center, run by Jeremy Folster; professional library; teacher's resource center; faculty lounge; principal's office; reading department; and a few classrooms.

C-Wing

The C-Wing houses the majority of all science classes on the lower floor. Its upper floor contains the foreign language department which offers Spanish, Portuguese, Italian, and French. The C-Wing also houses the Department of Grants, Media and Technology for the Milford Public Schools.

D-Wing

The D-Wing is the main technology wing of the school. Computer Science, Photography, and other technologies are located here. A special education room includes the Scarlet Bistro, providing gourmet food for the faculty.

E-Wing

The E-Wing contains the performing and fine arts areas. This includes the David I. Davoren auditorium, a 750-seat "almost" full theatre, complete with wings, wing-rooms, a catwalk, tech booth, and full lighting and sound capabilities. Also in the E-Wing are two music rooms, vocal and instrumental; three practice rooms; and the department office and music library. The music department conducts regular classes in music theory and instrumental techniques as well as producing performance groups such as the marching and concert bands, jazz band, and chorus. In addition, E-Wing houses the art room, business rooms, and programs offering food preparation, parenting, and the child care program. Lastly, the E-Wing contains the Hawk's Nest, the school store that is run by the school's special education students during lunch in order to give them experience in dealing with other people.

F-Wing

The F-Wing is home to the physical education department. The approximately 1,000-seat gymnasium, dance, wrestling, and weight training rooms, and swimming pool with one-meter diving board are used throughout the day. The recently renovated practice field is in constant use, both during and after school hours. These offerings give students a wide variety of physical education classes as well as exemplary facilities in which sporting events take place. As can be seen by the award banners in the gymnasium, MHS takes great pride in its athletic program at the instructional, intramural and interscholastic levels.

Central Administration Office

The Central Administration Office for the Milford Public Schools is located in the MHS building, in the front, off of the C-Wing.  All district-level administrators' offices are located here. Offices located here include those of the Superintendent, Assistant Superintendent, and Business Manager, as well as their respective secretaries.

Academics

Milford High School's traditional courses range from college preparatory and honors classes to more challenging Advanced Placement courses. Non-traditional courses range from video production and computer systems technology to graphic design, robotics and automation, and food service management.

Graduation requirements

The graduation requirements for the classes of 2014, 2015 and 2016 were as follows:
 English language arts – 22.5 credits
 Mathematics – 20 credits
 History and social sciences – 18 credits
 Science and technology – 15 credits
 Foreign language – 10 credits
 Practical/fine arts – 10 credits
 Physical education – 10 credits
 Health – 5 credits
 Electives – 19.5 credits
 Total – 130 credits

The graduation requirements for the class of 2017 were as follows:
 English language arts – 24 credits
 Mathematics – 24 credits
 History and social sciences – 21 credits
 Science and technology – 18 credits
 Foreign language – 12 credits
 Practical/fine arts – 9 credits
 Physical education – 6 credits
 Health – 3 credits
 Electives – 23 credits
 Total – 140 credits

There are also required credits by the end of each year. The amount a student needs for each year is:
 Freshman year: 20 credits
 Sophomore year: 60 credits
 Junior year: 100 credits
 Senior year: 140 credits

However, more credits are recommended each year.

Notable alumni

 Norm Abram, carpenter, writer, and television
 Al Cass, musician and inventor
 Chris Colabello, Major League Baseball player 
 Vincent Connare, font designer
 Paul Coyne, film editor and producer 
 Greg Dickerson, Boston sportscaster 
 Brian Fair, heavy metal musician
 Art Kenney, Major League Baseball player
 Charles Laquidara, radio disc jockey 
 Howie Long, football player and actor
 Ralph Lumenti, Major League Baseball player
 Joseph Murray, Nobel Prize–winning surgeon 
 George Pyne II, football player
 George Pyne III, football player
 Jim Pyne, football player
 Matt Ferrelli, Golfer

References

External links

Milford High School

Schools in Worcester County, Massachusetts
Milford, Massachusetts
Public high schools in Massachusetts
Hockomock League